In mathematics, the cobordism hypothesis, due to John C. Baez and James Dolan, concerns the classification of extended topological quantum field theories (TQFTs). In 2008, Jacob Lurie outlined a proof of the cobordism hypothesis, though the details of his approach have yet to appear in the literature as of 2022. In 2021, Daniel Grady and Dmitri Pavlov claimed a complete proof of the cobordism hypothesis, as well as a generalization to bordisms with arbitrary geometric structures.

Formulation 

Motivation 
Symmetric monoidal functors from the cobordism category correspond to topological quantum field theories. The cobordism hypothesis for topological quantum field theories is the analogue of the Eilenberg–Steenrod axioms for homology theories. The Eilenberg–Steenrod axioms state that a homology theory is uniquely determined by its value for the point, so analogously what the cobordism hypothesis states is that a topological quantum field theory is uniquely determined by its value for the point.

See also 
Cobordism

References

Further reading 

Seminar on the Cobordism Hypothesis and (Infinity,n)-Categories, 2013-04-22
Jacob Lurie (4 May 2009). On the Classification of Topological Field Theories

External links 
 

Quantum field theory